Zangezur is a 1938 Soviet Armenian war film by Hamo Beknazarian. The propaganda film is about the Dashnak opposition to the incursion of the Red Army and the local Bolshevik partisans in the Armenian province of Zangezur (present-day Syunik) at the time of Sovietization.

Cast

External links
 

1930s war drama films
Films directed by Hamo Beknazarian
Soviet black-and-white films
Films set in Armenia
Soviet war drama films
Soviet-era Armenian films
Armenfilm films
Films scored by Aram Khachaturian
Armenian drama films
1938 drama films
1938 films